Robert Wilson (June 23, 1974 – September 9, 2020) was an American professional football player who was a wide receiver for five seasons in the National Football League with the Seattle Seahawks and New Orleans Saints. He played college football at Florida A&M University and attended Jefferson County High School in Monticello, Florida. He was released by the Saints on September 1, 2002.

On September 9, 2020, Wilson died at the age of 46 due to complications resulting from a stroke.

As of 2022, his son, Robert Wilson, Jr., is a freshman defensive back for the Grambling State Tigers.

References

External links
Just Sports Stats

1974 births
2020 deaths
Players of American football from Tallahassee, Florida
American football wide receivers
African-American players of American football
Florida A&M Rattlers football players
Seattle Seahawks players
New Orleans Saints players
20th-century African-American sportspeople
21st-century African-American sportspeople